John N. Philbrook (1840–1923) was an American politician from Maine. A Republican, Philbrook served a term in the Maine House of Representatives (1893–1894) and in the Maine Senate (1903–1904) from Bethel, Maine. He also served as an Oxford County Commissioner. The John Philbrook House in Bethel was built by Philbrook and is named in his honor. It is on the National Register of Historic Places.

Philbrook was born in 1840 in Shelburne, New Hampshire and studied at Gould Academy in Bethel before settling there in 1862.

References

1840 births
1923 deaths
People from Coös County, New Hampshire
People from Bethel, Maine
Republican Party members of the Maine House of Representatives
Republican Party Maine state senators
County commissioners in Maine